Paul Benjamin Vogt (16 May 1863 – 1 January 1947) was a Norwegian politician of the Conservative Party who served as a member of the Council of State Division in Stockholm 1903–1904, Minister of Trade and Minister of Auditing 1904–1905. In 1905, he was Norway's emissary to Stockholm to negotiate Norwegian independence from Sweden. He also served as the Norway's minister in London 1910–1934.

Personal life
He was born in Kristiansand as a son of politician Niels Petersen Vogt (1817–1894) and Kaia Ancher Arntzen (1819–1870). He was a brother of editor Nils Vogt (1859–1927) and a second cousin of Johan Herman Lie Vogt, Nils Collett Vogt and Ragnar Vogt.

He completed his examen artium at Oslo Cathedral School in 1880 before studying law at university.

In April 1888 he married Andrea Severine "Daisy" Heyerdahl (1864–1946), daughter of a physician. They had several children. Stener Vogt became a businessman and consul. Their daughter Alethe Heyerdahl Vogt married businessman Fredrik C. Blom. Their daughter Daisy Vogt was the first wife of Diderich H. Lund. Another daughter Marie Leigh "Leiken" Vogt was the wife of Ferdinand Schjelderup, then a cohabitant with Emil Stang Jr.

References

1863 births
1947 deaths
Government ministers of Norway
People educated at Oslo Cathedral School
Politicians from Kristiansand
Ministers of Trade and Shipping of Norway